National Route 322 is a national highway of Japan connecting Kokura Kita-ku, Kitakyūshū and Kurume, Fukuoka in Japan, with a total length of 87.9 km (54.62 mi).

References

National highways in Japan
Roads in Fukuoka Prefecture